Andrew R.C. Marshall (born 1967) is a British journalist and author living in London, England. In January 2012 he joined Reuters news agency as Southeast Asia Special Correspondent. He won the 2014 Pulitzer Prize for International Reporting along with Jason Szep for their report on the violent persecution of the Rohingya, a Muslim minority in Myanmar.  He won his second Pulitzer, the 2018 prize, also for international reporting, along with Clare Baldwin and Manuel Mogato, for exposing the methods of police killing squads in Philippines President Rodrigo Duterte's war on drugs. He graduated from the University of Edinburgh in 1989 with an MA in English Literature.

In The Trouser People: a Story of Burma in the Shadow of the Empire, Marshall recounts the adventures of Sir George Scott as he bullied his way through uncharted jungle to establish British colonial rule in Burma and recounts his own adventures as he revisits many of the same places that Scott visited. Marshall is co-author of The Cult at the End of the World, a study of the Aum Shinrikyo.

References

External links
Andrew Marshall - Reporting from Asia on conflict, human rights, and climate change
Blood, Robes And Tears: A Rangoon Diary
Burma VJ: Truth as Casualty
Burma's Dawei project will be "10 times bigger" than Thailand's poisonous Map Ta Phut, but with no environmental oversight or labor rights

1967 births
Living people
Scottish journalists
Alumni of the University of Edinburgh
Pulitzer Prize for International Reporting winners